Darlene Faye Gillespie (born April 8, 1941) is a Canadian-American former child actress, most remembered as a singer and dancer on the original The Mickey Mouse Club television series from 1955 to 1959. Her Irish father and French Canadian mother were a former vaudeville dance team. When Darlene was two years old, her family moved to Los Angeles, where she became a naturalized U.S. citizen in September 1956 at the age of fifteen. After her career in entertainment ended, she became a nurse.

Biography

Early life and career
Gillespie was born in Montreal, Quebec, Canada. She auditioned for The Mickey Mouse Club in March 1955, was hired, and appeared on the program for all three seasons of its original run. She was the leading female singer and starred in the serial Corky and White Shadow during the first season. In the third season, she appeared in the serial The New Adventures of Spin and Marty with Tim Considine and David Stollery. Her sister Gina Gillespie was a child actress in television and films who eventually became a lawyer.

She was cast as Dorothy in a musical number from the proposed live-action Disney film Rainbow Road to Oz on an episode of the Disneyland television series in September 1957. The movie was never made, and after The Mickey Mouse Club stopped filming in 1958, her short acting career neared its end. Her last television appearance was as Beth Brian in the 1962 episode "The Star" of the NBC family drama series National Velvet starring Lori Martin as a budding thoroughbred rider.

Gillespie made many recordings under various Disney labels, including an album of 1950s rock and roll standards, Darlene of the Teens (1957). She sang the songs "Valentine Greetings" and "My Pa", a song that she sang in "Corky and White Shadow", from the album "Happy Birthday and Other Holiday Songs". She recorded albums from Disney animated films in which she sang and narrated stories such as Alice in Wonderland and Sleeping Beauty. 

In 1975, attempting to revive her singing career, she formed her own record company, Alva Records, and released a 45 rpm record of country songs under the name Darlene Valentine.

When Annette Funicello became a singing and acting star, Darlene became very jealous as a youth and an adult. She did not want to be in the same room as Funicello at Mouseketeer reunions.

She was banned from participating in the 40th anniversary Mickey Mouse Club documentary because of her criticisms of Disney and Funicello.

Arrests
In 1997, she was charged with petty theft for helping her then-fiancé Jerry Fraschilla shoplift four women's shirts. She was found guilty and sentenced to three days in jail and three years' probation. Gillespie, then 56 years old, denied the charges and filed preliminary papers to appeal. The disposition is unclear.

In December 1998, she was convicted in federal court of aiding her third husband, Fraschilla, to purchase securities using a check-kiting scheme. She was sentenced to two years in prison, but was released after serving only three months.

In 2005, she and her husband were indicted on federal charges of filing multiple fraudulent claims in the settlement of a class-action lawsuit. The charges have since been dropped. Fraschilla died in 2008.

References

External links

1941 births
Living people
Actresses from Montreal
20th-century American women singers
20th-century American actresses
Anglophone Quebec people
Mouseketeers
Canadian emigrants to the United States
American television actresses
Naturalized citizens of the United States
Singers from Montreal
American nurses
American women nurses
American people convicted of theft
American people convicted of fraud
20th-century American singers
Canadian people of Irish descent
Canadian people of French descent